Counterfeit is a 1936 American crime film directed by Erle C. Kenton and starring Chester Morris, Marian Marsh, Margot Grahame and Lloyd Nolan. A treasury department agent goes undercover to infiltrate a gang who have kidnapped an employee of the department and are forcing him to produce counterfeit notes.

Cast
 Chester Morris as John Joseph Madden 
 Marian Marsh as Verna Maxwell
 Margot Grahame as Aimee Maxwell 
 Lloyd Nolan as Capper Stevens  
 Claude Gillingwater as Tom Perkins 
 George McKay as Angel White 
 John Gallaudet as Pete Dailey 
 Gene Morgan as Gus 
 Pierre Watkin as Matt McDonald 
 Marc Lawrence as Dint Coleman

References

Bibliography
 Michael Schlossheimer. Gunmen and Gangsters: Profiles of Nine Actors Who Portrayed Memorable Screen Tough Guys. McFarland, 2001.

External links
 

1936 films
1936 crime films
1930s English-language films
American crime films
Films directed by Erle C. Kenton
Columbia Pictures films
American black-and-white films
1930s American films